Shepshed railway station was a station on the Charnwood Forest Railway. Near the town of Shepshed, Leicestershire. 

The station closed on 13 April 1931 when passenger services on the line were withdrawn. Today, nothing remains of the station which is now occupied by an industrial estate, although the line is traceable.

References

Route 

Disused railway stations in Leicestershire
Former London and North Western Railway stations
Railway stations in Great Britain opened in 1883
Railway stations in Great Britain closed in 1931